Han Zhijun (born 21 February 1930) is a Communist cadre and widow of Hua Guofeng, Chairman of the Communist Party of China and Premier of China. She has been described as "China's most mysterious first lady", as she rarely appeared with her husband in public.

Biography
Han was born in 1930 to a peasant household in a small village in Wutai County. Her father participated in training drills organised by the Eighth Route Army during the Second Sino-Japanese War and reportedly returned home to teach his daughter revolutionary songs. Han would then teach these songs to the members of the Children's Corps. An uncle later described her as a smart and alert young girl, who was more use than the older male youths, and led the Children's Corps in guard duty. Han later recalled that the years 1941–1943 as the most desperate living under the Japanese army's white terror. In 1945, Han's mother joined the Communist Party and worked for the National Salvation Women's Corps, using the family's crops to feed members of the Eighth Route Army, and Han entered the workforce in 1945.In 1948, Han was a cadre in a provincial organisation. She married Hua Guofeng in November that year.In August 1949, she went with Hua when he became party secretary of Xiangyin County. Their eldest child, Su Hua, was born in early 1950. The family moved to Beijing in 1951, after Hua was transferred to the State Council.

As first lady
Han never accompanied Chairman Hua on business trips abroad and the two rarely appeared in public together. Reportedly, Han continued to cycle to and from work. She served as director of the cadre department of the import-export company of the Ministry of Light Industry from 1975. In 1978, she participated in the 4th executive committee of the All-China Women's Federation.Since Hua's death, Han has made public appearances at his memorial services, and the 2013 and 2014 Spring Festival celebrations, where she was publicly greeted by Xi Jinping and Zhang Dejiang, respectively.

References

1930 births
Living people
People's Republic of China politicians from Shanxi
Politicians from Xinzhou
Women in war in China
Chinese Communist Party politicians from Shanxi
Women in warfare post-1945